Ken Houghton (born 18 October 1939, Rotherham) is a former football player and manager. A striker, he played for Rotherham United, Hull City and Scunthorpe United, where he scored a combined total of 140 goals in 434 league appearances. He was later appointed player-coach at Scarborough leading them to the final of the 1974-75 FA Trophy. He also had spells as manager of his former club Hull City and Bridlington Town.

References

External links
Profile on Hull City fan site
 http://www.doingthe92.com/display_player.asp?step=61&ID=65&pid=25703&ptag=Ken_Houghton

1939 births
English footballers
Hull City A.F.C. managers
Hull City A.F.C. players
Living people
Rotherham United F.C. players
Scarborough F.C. players
Scunthorpe United F.C. players
Scarborough F.C. managers
Association football midfielders
English football managers
Footballers from Rotherham